Emil Strub (13 July 1858 in Trimbach, Switzerland – 15 December 1909) was a Swiss builder, railway builder and inventor who invented the Strub rack system.

Publications 
 : a comparison of the funiculars

See also
 Abt rack system 
 Rack systems

Swiss designers
Transport engineers
1858 births
1909 deaths
Swiss railway mechanical engineers
Swiss railway pioneers
Rack railways